Francis E. Donoghue (1872–1952) was a member of Illinois State House of Representatives from 1901 to 1905 and from 1907 to 1909. He was an Irish Catholic Democrat from Chicago, representing Cook County.

References

1872 births
1952 deaths
American people of Irish descent
Members of the Illinois House of Representatives
Politicians from Chicago